Cachito de Cielo (Little bit of Heaven), is a song written, arranged and performed by Mexican recording artist Pedro Fernández. The song was released on the special edition album "No Que No... edición especial" in 2012 and released as a single in 2013.

This song was the theme song of the popular telenovela Cachito de cielo in which Pedro starred as the protagonist. He wrote the song while thinking about the plot of the novel.

Pedro Fernández won the Latin Grammy Award for Best Regional Mexican Song (2013) as songwriter and performing artist for "Cachito de Cielo". Live performance. This was Pedro's third Latin Grammy Awarded to him for his music.

References

2013 songs
2013 singles
Pedro Fernández (singer) songs
Songs written by Pedro Fernández (singer)
Latin Grammy Award for Best Regional Mexican Song
Telenovela theme songs
Capitol Latin singles